In Greek Mythology, Bremusa (Ancient Greek: Βρεμούσα means 'raging female') was one of 12 Amazonian warriors. She was born in Themiskyra in 1204 BC and fought with Penthesilea.

Mythology 
Bremusa was killed outside of Troy by Idomeneus of Crete."Then with his lance Idomeneus thrust out, and by the right breast stabbed Bremusa. Stilled for ever was the beating of her heart. She fell, as falls a graceful-shafted pine hewn mid the hills by woodmen: heavily, sighing through all its boughs, it crashes down. So with a wailing shriek she fell, and death unstrung her every limb: her breathing soul mingled with multitudinous-sighing winds."

Notes

References 

 Quintus Smyrnaeus, The Fall of Troy translated by Way. A. S. Loeb Classical Library Volume 19. London: William Heinemann, 1913. Online version at theio.com
 Quintus Smyrnaeus, The Fall of Troy. Arthur S. Way. London: William Heinemann; New York: G.P. Putnam's Sons. 1913. Greek text available at the Perseus Digital Library.

External links
Brave Women Warriors Of Greek Myth: An Amazon Roster

Amazons of the Trojan war